Eupithecia repetita is a moth in the family Geometridae. It is found in Afghanistan and western Pakistan.

References

Moths described in 1981
repetita
Moths of Asia